The Quad City Thunder was a Continental Basketball Association franchise that was based in the Quad Cities of Illinois and Iowa. They played in the CBA from the 1987–88 season until the CBA folded in 2001.  The Thunder were successful on the court, capturing CBA championships in the 1993–94 and 1997–98 seasons, and runner-up in the 1990–91 season. The Thunder played in Moline, Illinois, first at Wharton Field House before moving to the new MARK of the Quad Cities in 1993.

History
The Thunder first began play at the Wharton Field House in Moline, Illinois, (former home of the NBA's Tri-Cities Blackhawks) in the 1987–88 season, with 6,047 fans attending the first home game. The Thunder were the first professional basketball franchise in the Quad Cities since the Tri-Cities Blackhawks moved to Milwaukee, Wisconsin, in 1953.  Initially a great success in the CBA, the Thunder struggled with attendance towards the end of their existence, especially with competition from their co-tenants at the Mark, the Quad City Mallards hockey team. During their existence, the franchise was owned by Anne Potter DeLong (1987–1997),  Jay Gellerman (1997–1999),  Isiah Thomas (1999–2000) and a Blind Trust  (2000–2001). The Thunder folded when the CBA ceased operations following the 2000–01 season.

In 1992, history was made when, for the first time in the 45-year history of U.S. professional basketball, a father and son opposed one another as head coaches. Former Thunder Coach Mauro Panaggio went head to head against son Dan Panaggio when Mauro's Rockford Lightning played Dan's Quad City Thunder.

Championship seasons

1993–1994
The 1993–1994 team went 34–22 under Dan Panaggio. They swept through the playoffs. They first defeated the Rochester Renegades in overtime of a playoff play-in in Bismarck, N.D. They then defeated the Grand Rapids Hoops 4–1 in best-of-seven second round; Defeated the La Crosse Catbirds 4–0 in conference finals. 

Finally, the Thunder defeated the Omaha Racers 4–1, winning last three on road to claim franchise’s first league title. The Thunder won the opener in double overtime after Tate George tied the game with last-second buckets at both the end of regulation and of the first overtime. The Thunder then lost the second game in triple overtime, but won three straight in Omaha, the last in overtime. 

Chris Childs averaged 17.4 points and 8.5 assists in the playoffs, was the Finals MVP and went on to  the National Basketball Association. Other key players were Harold Ellis 21.4ppg, Tate George 16.4, Bobby Martin 13.6, Barry Mitchell 13.0, Matt Fish 7.1RPG, Ashraf Amaya 6.9, and Cedric Henderson 6.1.

1997–1998
 
The 1997–98 Thunder finished 38–18 under Dan Panaggio. In the playoffs they swept the  Swept La Crosse Catbirds in three games and defeated the Rockford Lightning in five games. 

In the CBA Finals, they won a deciding seventh at home over the Sioux Falls Skyforce to capture their second CBA Championship. Key players were: Jimmy King 16.4ppg, Jeff McInnis 14.9ppg, Alvin Sims 13.6ppg, Doug Smith 12.8ppg, Willie Burton 11.6, Byron Houston 8.7Rpg, and Barry Sumpter. King won league MVP, McInnis was Newcomer of the Year, Sims became the Thunder’s first Rookie of the Year and Dan Panaggio won his second Coach of the Year award.

The Thunder and their fans enjoyed a spirited rivalry with the Rockford Lightning.

The Thunder's mascot was Thor, the Norse god of thunder.

Hall of Fame player George Gervin played for the Thunder in 1989–90.

Quad City Thunder Personnel

Franchise Coaches
 Mauro Panaggio 132–88 15–18 (1987–1991)
 Dan Panaggio 313–191 41–30 (1991–2000)
 Bob Thornton 8–13 (2000–2001) .

Thunder CBA Most Valuable Player 
 1992 Barry Mitchell
 1993 Derek Strong
 1998 Jimmy King
 2000 Jeff McInnis

Thunder NBA Callups

1988–89
Kevin Gamble, Boston
Bill Jones, New Jersey
Anthony Bowie, San Antonio
Corey Gaines, New Jersey
Barry Sumpter, L.A. Clippers

1989–90
Nate Johnston, Portland, Utah
Kenny Gattison, Charlotte

1990–91
A. J. Wynder, Boston
Tony Harris, Philadelphia

1991–92
Steve Scheffler, Sacramento
Anthony Bowie, Orlando

1992–93
Derek Strong, Milwaukee

1993–94
Harold Ellis, L.A. Clippers
Morlon Wiley, Miami

1994–95
Greg Sutton, Charlotte
Kevin Pritchard, Philadelphia, Miami
Randolph Keys, Lakers, Milwaukee 
Tate George, Milwaukee

1995–96
Kevin Pritchard, Washington

1996–97
Joe Courtney, Philadelphia
Erick Strickland, Dallas
Rich Manning, L.A. Clippers
Jimmy King, Denver
Matt Steigenga, Chicago

1997–98
Litterial Green, Milwaukee
Willie Burton, San Antonio

1998–99
J.R. Henderson, Vancouver
Jeff McInnis, Washington

1999-00
Jeff McInnis, L.A. Clippers
Maceo Baston, Milwaukee
Jamel Thomas, Boston, Portland

2000–01
John Coker, Golden State .

Quad City Thunder All-Time Roster

References

External links
 http://www.qcthunder.com/

 
Defunct basketball teams in the United States
Defunct sports teams in Illinois
Defunct sports teams in Iowa
Basketball teams in Illinois
Basketball teams established in 1987
Basketball teams disestablished in 2001
1987 establishments in Illinois
2001 disestablishments in Illinois
Moline, Illinois
Rock Island County, Illinois
Sports teams in the Quad Cities